Kütüklü is a village in the Beşiri District of Batman Province in Turkey. The village is populated by Kurds of the Elîkan tribe and had a population of 194 in 2021.

The hamlet of Kumrulu is attached to the village.

References 

Villages in Beşiri District
Kurdish settlements in Batman Province